The Battle of Patan was fought on 20 June 1790 between the Maratha Kingdom of Gwalior supported by Peshwa & Holkar and the alliance formed by the Rajput Kingdom of Jaipur, Kingdom of Jodhpur, which resulted in a decisive Maratha victory.

Ambush by the Marathas

At dusk, Rajputs and their allies, retired to their respective camps. The Maratha army however held its positions at the mouth of the pass. The real battle however precipitated in the evening by an unforeseen skirmish. Some Maratha Pindaris from the left wing of Maratha lines, managed to seize animals that were a part of Ismail Beg's contingent.  This inevitably led to a small skirmish with Ismail Beg's men.  General de Boigne then directed his guns on Ismail Beg's contingent.  Caught on unaware, the murderous fire of Maratha guns proved to be deadly. Gopal Bhau and de Boigne, sensing victory, went for the kill. Marathas descended upon enemy camps. Taken aback by the suddenness and the ferocity of the Maratha attack, Rajput resistance capitulated, many were slaughtered in their sleep while others were too intoxicated to fight. The only event worth noting was the Rathor charge on the Maratha right wing. The 4,000 strong Holkar contingent was saved by swift reinforcements sent by Gopal Bhau. The Jaipur Nagas were forced in their positions by the two battalions sent by Boigne. De Boigne after routing the centre and left wing of the alliance, turned all of his forces to the right. The Rathors were soon surrounded and routed, resulting in heavy losses and the death of the Jodhpur general Gangaram. The Gwalior army did not lose any officers apart from two wounded.

The victory at Patan destroyed the armies of the two most powerful Rajput kingdoms of India and forced them to pay heavy tributes to the Peshwas and Scindias. Ismail Beg's army was also reduced to a few hundred men and were forced to flee.

Aftermath

Pitted against European armed and French trained Marathas, Rajput states capitulated one after the other. Marathas managed to conquer Ajmer and Malwa from Rajputs. Although Jaipur and Jodhpur remained unconquered. Battle of Patan, effectively ended Rajput hopes for independence from external interference. Sir Jadunath Sarkar notes:

From the day of Patan (20th June 1790) to the 2nd of April 1818 when Jaipur entered into protective subsidiary alliance with the British government, lay the gloomiest period in the history of Jaipur kingdom.

His victory increased Scindia's influence with the Peshwas (Maratha Prime Ministers) in Pune, the seat of Maratha government and firmly established Maratha influence in Rajputana.

References

Sources
 
 

Patan
Patan
1790 in India
Patan
History of Rajasthan